Edward John Ivo Stourton (born November 1957) is a British broadcaster and presenter of the BBC Radio 4 programme Sunday, and was a frequent contributor to the Today programme, where for ten years he was one of the main presenters. He is the author of eight books, most recently Confessions (2023).

Early life and education
Stourton was born in the then British colony of Nigeria as his father was based there. He was educated at the now defunct Roman Catholic preparatory school Avisford in Walberton and at Ampleforth College in North Yorkshire and was head boy in his final year at both establishments.

While at Ampleforth he befriended future High Court judge Nicholas Mostyn, who was also the son of a Nigerian-based BAT executive. The duo won the national ESU Schools Mace debating prize in 1975. He read English literature at Trinity College, Cambridge, gaining a 2:1. He served as president of the Cambridge Union Society and editor of the student magazine Rampage.

Broadcasting
He joined the staff of ITN in 1979 as a graduate trainee. While working there he was a founder member of Channel 4 News in 1982 working predominantly as a copywriter but also as a producer, duty home news editor and chief sub-editor. Stourton joined the BBC in 1988 as a Paris correspondent. He returned to ITN as a diplomatic editor in 1990. In 1993, he was back at the BBC as the presenter of BBC One O'Clock News for six years. He presented editions of Assignment, Correspondent, Panorama and Call Ed Stourton, a phone-in programme on Radio 4.

He has made a number of current affairs programmes for Radio 4 including Asia Gold and Global Shakeout, The Violence Files, With us or against us, United Nations – or Not?. Asia Gold was the winner of the Sony Radio Gold Award for current affairs in 1997. Stourton presented a four-part series about the Catholic church, entitled Absolute Truth. It was broadcast on BBC2 in 1997. He also wrote a book to accompany the series.

In 2001, he won the Amnesty International Award for best television documentary for an episode of Correspondent about the Khiam detention center during the Israeli occupation of Southern Lebanon. His series, A Year in the Arab Israeli Crisis, was broadcast on BBC Radio 4 and the BBC World Service in 2005.

Today
In January 1999, he joined the BBC's Today programme presentation team. It was announced on 12 December 2008 that he would leave the programme in September 2009, to be replaced by Justin Webb. This announcement was greeted with widespread public dismay not least because Stourton found out about it from a journalist rather than his employers. Following a campaign by listeners, it was announced on 27 December 2008 that he was not being sacked. Instead, shortly after Justin Webb joined the Today Programme in August 2009, Stourton moved from presenting duties to reporting on foreign stories. Stourton presented Today for the last time on 11 September 2009. Since leaving his presentation role on the Today programme, Stourton has joined the presenting teams of The World at One and The World This Weekend.

On 27 December 2006 he appeared on the celebrity charitable edition of BBC One's Mastermind, chaired by his BBC Radio 4 Today co-presenter John Humphrys. When asked his name, Stourton replied: "John, why do you need to ask that? We almost sleep together!" His specialist subject was Pope John Paul II on which he scored 17 points, for a total of 28 points after general knowledge to win his heat.

Religious programmes
Stourton is a Roman Catholic who regularly presents Sunday, Radio 4's religious and ethical current affairs programme.

Personal life
Stourton is a descendant of the 19th Baron Stourton and in very distant remainder to this barony presently held by his cousin James Stourton, 28th Baron Mowbray. He is the son of Nigel Stourton CBE, who worked for British American Tobacco, and Rosemary Abbott, being brought up near Patrick Brompton.

In Kensington in 1980, he married Margaret McEwen, the daughter of Sir James Napier Finnie McEwen, a baronet.  They had three children together before divorcing.

He married former colleague Fiona Murch on 8 November 2002 at Chelsea Register Office. She was an editor for BBC Two (producing the Correspondent programme, in which Stourton featured, although he left the programme) with whom he had lived from 2001. They live in Stockwell, south London. He is a Roman Catholic and has an extensive knowledge of the Roman Catholic faith.

Publications
 John Paul II: Man of History (Hodder & Stoughton)  2 April 2006
 In the Footsteps of St Paul (Hodder & Stoughton)  20 May 2004
 Absolute Truth: The Catholic Church Today (Viking Press)  1 October 1998
 It's a PC World: What It Means to Live in a Land Gone Politically Correct (Hodder & Stoughton)  13 November 2008
 Diary of a Dog-Walker: Time Spent Following a Lead (Doubleday) , 9 June 2011
 Cruel Crossing: Escaping Hitler Across the Pyrenees (Doubleday) , 25 April 2013
 Auntie's War: The BBC During the Second World War (Doubleday) , 2 November 2017
 Confessions (Doubleday) , 26 January 2023

References

External links
 
 United Nations – or Not?
 With us or against us
 A Year in the Arab Israeli Crisis
 Keeping the Faith, BBC Radio 4 series in which people of different religions look at the English Reformation through the experience of their ancestors.

1957 births
Alumni of Trinity College, Cambridge
BBC newsreaders and journalists
BBC World Service people
British male journalists
British radio personalities
ITN newsreaders and journalists
Living people
People educated at Ampleforth College
Presidents of the Cambridge Union
Writers from Lagos
BBC Radio 4 presenters
Nigerian people of British descent
Nigerian emigrants to the United Kingdom
 British Roman Catholics